The Dalhart Unit is a Texas Department of Criminal Justice prison for men located in unincorporated Hartley County, Texas. It is located next to Dalhart Municipal Airport. As of 2000 Dalhart serves minimum and medium security inmates.

History
The unit opened in February 1995. The unit was named in memory of R.C. Johnson, a longtime sheriff of Dallam County, and Steve Booth, a Texas Department of Public Safety (DPS) trooper who was killed. In September 2007 62% of the prison's job positions were filled, making the Dalhart Unit among the most under-staffed units in the state. In October 2007 an entire wing of the prison was closed because there were too few officers to properly monitor the wing. Staffing is a constant problem, press reports indicated that in 2018, the facility was at 51% staffing.

References

External links

 Dalhart Unit - Texas Department of Criminal Justice

Prisons in Texas
Buildings and structures in Hartley County, Texas
1995 establishments in Texas